Sturt may refer to:

 Sturt (surname)
 Sturt (biology), a unit of measurement in embryology named for Alfred Sturtevant

Places and things named after Charles Sturt, a British explorer of Australia, include:

Australia 

 Sturt Highway, a national highway in New South Wales, Victoria, and South Australia.

New South Wales 

 Sturt National Park, New South Wales
 Charles Sturt University, a university in Wagga Wagga

Queensland 

 Sturt, Queensland, a locality in the Shire of Boulia

South Australia 

Sturt, South Australia, a suburb of Adelaide
Sturt Football Club, an Australian Rules Football club
Sturt River, Adelaide
Sturt Street, Adelaide
City of Charles Sturt, a city
Point Sturt, a town
Division of Sturt, a federal electoral district in South Australia
Electoral district of Sturt (New South Wales), former New South Wales Legislative Assembly electorate
Electoral district of Sturt (South Australia), former South Australian House of Assembly electorate

See also

 Stuart (disambiguation)
Sterte